The Asian Football Confederation's pre-Olympic tournament was contested by eighteen teams that competed for the two allocated spots for the 2012 Summer Olympics football tournament in London. However, Qatar withdrew before playing any match. The competition was originally scheduled for February 2010 but it eventually started in March 2011.

Format
The format was as follows:
First round
The highest-ranked 5 teams in the previous tournament (Australia, China, Japan, North Korea and South Korea) received byes to the final round. Other 12 teams were divided into 3 groups by their geographical positions, where each group consisted of a one-round league (round-robin) tournament at a centralized venue. Five teams (the winners and the runners-up of Group A and C, respectively, and the winners of Group B) advanced to the second round.
Second round
5 teams that advanced from the first round played a one-round league (round-robin) tournament at a centralized venue. The winner advanced to the final round.
Final round
6 teams (5 teams with the byes and 1 team from the second round) played a one-round league (round-robin) tournament at a centralized venue. The winners and runners-up qualified for the [[Football at the 2012 Summer Olympics – Women's tournament|Football tournament in the 2012

First round

Group A 
All matches were held in Kaohsiung, Taiwan (Chinese Taipei).

Group B 
All matches were held in Dhaka, Bangladesh.

Play-off match 
 Since both India and Uzbekistan were tied on points and goal difference, a play-off match was played to decide the winner of the group:

Group C 
All matches were held in Zarqa, Jordan.

Second round 
All matches were held in Amman, Jordan.

Final round 
All matches were held in Jinan, Shandong, China.

See also
Football at the 2012 Summer Olympics – Women's tournament
Football at the 2012 Summer Olympics – Men's Asian Qualifiers

References

External links
 Official site of the AFC Olympic Qualifiers

Football at the 2012 Summer Olympics – Women's qualification
AFC
women
2012